The Philanthropist is a quarterly academic journal devoted to the legal, management and accounting issues facing charitable and not-for-profit organizations in Canada.  It was founded as an occasional publication of the Trusts and Estates Section of the Canadian Bar Association - Ontario (now the Ontario Bar Association) in Toronto, Ontario, Canada in 1972.  Its first Editor was Bertha Wilson, later a judge of the Supreme Court of Canada.  For a time during the 1980s it was an official publication of the Canadian Centre for Philanthropy (now Imagine Canada).  It derives its funding from the Agora Foundation in Toronto.  The Ontario Law Reform Commission's Report on the Law of Charities (1996) called it "informed rather than learned".  Its content is overseen by a volunteer editorial board drawn from the charitable sector, law, accounting and academia.  As of May 2009 the current and archived content is available electronically at no charge.

External links
The Philanthropist official site

Law journals